Acalolepta elongata is a species of beetle in the family Cerambycidae. It was described by Stephan von Breuning in 1935. It is known from India, China, Myanmar and Laos.

References

Acalolepta
Beetles described in 1935